Improvised Music from Japan is a website and record label.

The website was originally known as Japanese Free Improvisers. As its name suggests, it concentrates on Japanese and Japan-based improvisers, particularly free improvisers.

In December 2001, a compilation box-set, also called Improvised Music from Japan, was released to mark the fifth anniversary of the website. It was a 10 CD collection of previously unissued material from a variety of Japanese musicians (some of them collaborating with Europeans and Americans). The artists featured on the release are:

 Tetuzi Akiyama
 Big Picture (band)
 Haco
 Shoji Hano
 Junji Hirose
 Ryoji Hojito
 Yoshimitsu Ichiraku
 Kazuo Imai
 Incapacitants
 Atsuhiro Ito
 Utah Kawasaki
 Kyoko Kuroda
 Brett Larner
 Sachiko M
 Toshimaru Nakamura
 Takehito Nakazato
 Mitsuru Nasuno
 Masahiko Okura
 Aki Onda
 Yasuhiro Otani
 Otomo Yoshihide
 Tetsu Saitoh
 Michihiro Sato
 Skist
 Taku Sugimoto
 Tamaru
 Yumiko Tanaka
 Tsuguto Tsunoda
 Kazuhisa Uchihashi
 Michiyo Yagi
 Seiichi Yamamoto
 Tetsuro Yasunaga
 Ami Yoshida
 Yasuhiro Yoshigaki

The label has since released a number of other records featuring similar artists:

 Toshimaru Nakamura, Tetuzi Akiyama and guests, Meeting at Off Site Vol. 1 (IMJ-501, April 2002)
 Otomo Yoshihide, Ensemble Cathode (IMJ-502, July 2002)
 Kaffe Matthews, Andrea Neumann and Sachiko M, In Case of Fire Take the Stairs (IMJ-503, December 2002)
 Ami Yoshida, Tiger Thrush (IMJ-504, July 2003)
 Shoji Hano, 48 (IMJ-505, May 2003)
 Toshimaru Nakamura, Tetuzi Akiyama and guests, Meeting at Off Site Vol. 2 (IMJ-506, May 2003)
 Yumiko Tanaka, Tayutauta (IMJ-507, due January 2004)
 Raku Sugifatti (Radu Malfatti and Taku Sugimoto), Futatsu (IMJ-508/9, December 2003)
 Aki Onda, Bon Voyage! (IMJ-510, October 2003)
 Otomo Yoshihide, Park Je Chun and Mi Yeon, Loose Community (IMJ-511, December 2003)
 Peter Brötzmann and Shoji Hano, Funny Rat (IMJ-512, October 2003)
 Toshimaru Nakamura, Side Guitar (IMJ-513, December 2003)
 Han Bennink and Kazuo Imai, Across the Desert (IMJ-514, December 2003)
 Toshimaru Nakamura, Tetuzi Akiyama and guests, Meeting at Off Site Vol. 3 (IMJ-515, December 2003)

Other Japanese artists which could be considered free improvisers include:

 Kaoru Abe
 Masayuki Takayanagi

See also
 List of Japanoise artists

External links
 Home page

Musical improvisation
Japanese music websites
Japanese record labels